Volk-Man (civilname: Volkmar Weber, born 9 January 1974 in Weimar) is a German bassist and vocalist.

Biography 

He currently plays for Die Apokalyptischen Reiter and writes for the German Metal magazines Legacy (formerly Deftone) and Rock Hard. He was also the main editor of the (in-)famous German underground fanzine, Cothurnus.

Discography of Die Apokalyptischen Reiter 

Album:
1997 – Soft & Stronger
1999 – Allegro Barbaro
2000 – All You Need Is Love
2003 – Have a Nice Trip
2004 – Samurai
2006 – Riders on the Storm
2008 – Licht
2011 – Moral & Wahnsinn
2014 – Tief.Tiefer 
2017 – Der Rote Reiter

Demo:
1996 – Firestorm (Demo)

EP:
1998 – Dschinghis Khan (EP)
2006 – Friede sei mit Dir (EP)
2008 – Der Weg (EP)

DVD:
2006 – Friede sei mit Dir (Live-DVD)
2008 – Tobsucht (DVD and 2 Live-CDs)

External links
 Profile
 Volk-Man Blog
 Volk-Man MySpace

1974 births
Living people
German heavy metal singers
Musicians from Weimar
German heavy metal bass guitarists
Male bass guitarists
21st-century German  male singers
21st-century bass guitarists
German male guitarists